Galloway was a county constituency in the Galloway area of Scotland. It elected one Member of Parliament (MP) to the House of Commons of the Parliament of the United Kingdom, by the first past the post voting system.

It was created for the 1918 general election, and abolished for the 1983 general election, when it was partly replaced by the new Galloway and Upper Nithsdale constituency.

Members of Parliament

Election results

Elections in the 1910s

Elections in the 1920s

Elections in the 1930s

Elections in the 1940s 
General Election 1939–40

Another General Election was required to take place before the end of 1940. The political parties had been making preparations for an election to take place from 1939 and by the end of this year, the following candidates had been selected; 
Unionist: John Mackie

Elections in the 1950s

Elections in the 1960s

Elections in the 1970s

References 

Historic parliamentary constituencies in Scotland (Westminster)
Constituencies of the Parliament of the United Kingdom established in 1918
Constituencies of the Parliament of the United Kingdom disestablished in 1983
1918 establishments in Scotland
History of Galloway
Politics of Dumfries and Galloway